Climate change in Ghana is impacting the people in Ghana in several ways as the country sits at the intersection of three hydro-climatic zones. Changes in rainfall, weather conditions and sea-level rise will affect the salinity of coastal waters. This is expected to negatively affect both farming and fisheries. 

The national economy stands to suffer from the impacts of climate change because of its dependence on climate-sensitive sectors such as agriculture, energy, and forestry. Moreover, access to freshwater is expected to become more challenging while reduced water supply will have a negative impact on hydropower, which provides 54% of the country's electricity capacity. Additionally, Ghana will likely see more cases of malaria and cholera, since both are impacted by changes in water conditions. 

In 2015, the government produced a document titled "Ghana's Intended Nationally Determined Contribution". Following that, Ghana signed the Paris Climate Agreement in 2016. The Intended Nationally Determined Contribution after 2016 became the Nationally Determined Contributions commonly referred to as NDCs which was reviewed in 2021.

Greenhouse gas emissions

Fossil fuel production 
The Jubilee offshore oil field came into production in 2010, raising expectations for wealth creation in Ghana. However, the infrastructure needed to support Ghana's oil industry (storage, shipping, processing) has necessitated the practice of flaring. "Long-term gas flaring at the Jubilee Field may be inevitable" without accelerated development of infrastructure and would produce about 1.5 million tons of  annually (7 percent of Ghana's total national emissions).

Impacts on the natural environment

Temperature and weather changes 
Lake Volta, the largest artificial lake by surface area in the world, changed climate patterns in Ghana.

The drier northern areas have warmed at a more rapid rate than southern Ghana. Overall, Ghana has experienced a 1.0 °C. increase in temperature since 1960. Northern Ghana has only one rainy season, while southern Ghana has two and annual rainfall is highly variable. Long-term trends for rainfall are difficult to predict. However, USDA's Forest Service concluded in 2011 that there was "no evidence that extreme rain events have either increased or decreased since 1960."

However, when one compares the Köppen-Geiger climate classification map for 1980–2016 and the projected map for 2071–2100 predicted change in classification from "tropical, savannah" to "arid, steppe, hot" in some coastal areas."

Sea level rise 
Available data also shows a sea level rise of 2.1 mm per year over the last 30 years, indicating a rise of 5.8 cm, 16.5 cm, and 34.5 cm by  2020, 2050, and 2080.

Water resources 
Expected decreases in water in the primary rivers basins providing fresh water for the country, Volta River, Bia River, and Tano River, could increase challenges in getting access to clean drinking water. The volume of water in the Volta Basin was predicted to have a 24% and 45% reduction in 2050 and 2100 respectively. The continuous reduction in precipitation and increasing evaporation rate has the potential to cause political tension in the region as Burkina Faso plans to draw water from Volta Basin.

Impacts on people

Economic impacts

Agriculture 

Forty-five percent of the workforce in Ghana depends on small-holder rain-fed agriculture. Disruption due to erratic rainfall and other extreme weather will have a negative impact on people's economic well-being. Moreover, staple crops such as Cassava, Maize, and cocoa (the major cash crop of Ghana) are expected to see decreased production. Based on a 20-year baseline climate observation, it is forecasted that maize and other cereal crop yields will reduce by 7% by 2050.

Moreover, the combination of deforestation and new dams that dried up rivers has affected agriculture and in turn, brought migration to Accra which increased poor-quality unplanned settlements in the path of potential flash floods.

Fisheries 

Seafood makes up 40–60 percent of protein intake in Ghana. Key species for the economy are expected to have worse reproduction cycles
. Reduction in fisheries production has stimulated importation of more $200million per year worth of seafood.

Hydropower 

Because 54% of national generation capacity is hydropower, unpredictable rainfall is likely to add uncertainty to a power grid already experiencing frequent outages (known as dumsor). Some estimates suggest that capacity could fall by as much as 50% for the Volta Basin. Ghana experienced a reduction in GDP between 2012 and 2015 in partial response to a deficient supply of power.

Health impacts 

An increase in waterborne diseases such as cholera and mosquito-borne diseases like malaria are projected.

Mitigation and adaptation 
Ghana signed the Paris Agreement on 22 April 2016 and ratified it on 21 September 2016. The first national climate change adaptation strategy in Ghana was developed to be implemented between 2010 and 2020. Adaptation seeks to lower the risks posed by the consequences of climate change. Adaptation measures may be planned in advance or put in place spontaneously in response to local pressure such as afforestation, land rotation, building climate-resilient structures, solar-powered infrastructure, etc. The Ministry of Environment Science, Technology and Innovation published a policy framework in 2013. 

In 2015, Ghana developed a framework entitled "Ghana's Intended Nationally Determined Contribution" to outline a plan to reduce carbon emissions and to improve eternity of land use, transportation, and other economic and societal sectors.

Ghana still needs to develop long-term contingency plans for dealing with climate change as local managers seem to have an inadequate perception of the costs of dealing with such crises.

References 

Ghana
Environment of Ghana
Ghana